Al-Mansura  is a Syrian town located in Al-Thawrah District, Raqqa.  According to the Syria Central Bureau of Statistics (CBS), Al-Mansura had a population of 16,158 in the 2004 census.

References 

Populated places in Raqqa Governorate